Eurong is an island town and a locality on Fraser Island (also known as K'Gari and Gari) in the Fraser Coast Region, Queensland, Australia.

Geography 
Fraser Island is divided into two localities, one very small one, Eurong, and very large one called Fraser Island (the locality) with Happy Valley its only town. Eurong is on the east coast of Fraser Island facing the Coral Sea about one quarter of the length of the island from its southern trip. Consequently, on the land, Eurong is completely surrounded by the locality of Fraser Island.

History 

The name Eurong is believed to be a Kabi language word meaning rain forest.

Timber getting was the first industry in the area. By 1927, there was a settlement of forestry workers and their families (approximately 50 people) in the Eurong area. It was a very isolated settlement with a fortnightly steamer service to go to Maryborough for the weekend for shopping; apart from there was no communication or transport from Eurong. The housing was primitive, often not weatherproof in the rain. However, there was an excellent water supply from the creek.

By 1937, the settlement had developed and included a dance hall. Groups of people started to come from Maryborough and Pialba to Eurong for sightseeing, swimming, picnicking, and dancing, the beginning of the tourist industry that exists today.

References

External links 

 

Fraser Coast Region
Localities in Queensland
Fraser Island